Jules Alex Nyom (born 3 January 1984), is a Cameroonian soccer goalkeeper, who last played in 2011.

He played for clubs in Cameroon, USA and for the Finnish football club, Rovaniemen Palloseura.

Career

Early career
Nyom played for the Etoile of Essazock and Canon de Yaounde in Cameroon, ES Sétif in Algeria.

Minnesota Twin Stars
In 2007, he signed with Minnesota Twin Stars. During the 2008 season, he helped the team win their first Midwest Regional title; he missed the Final Four National Championship in New York and they lost in the final 2–1 to the Pennsylvania Stoners. In 2009 he was team captain for the NPSL Final Four Tournament (as Juan Fiz was injured), winning another Midwest Region title, earning a name on the Midwest All-Star team, but eventually losing to Sonoma County Sol 4–1.

RoPS
In 2010 Nyom signed for RoPS of Finland. In his second match he received a Man of the Match award. Nyom played a total of 11 games in the 2010 season, shutting out the opposition in 7 matches. These performances during the regular season led to the team finishing as champions of the Ykkönen, and a secured promotion to the Veikkausliiga for the 2011 season.

Nyom made 35 appearances for RoPs; 32 in the league, and 3 in the cup before being released in 2011.

References

Cameroonian footballers
Cameroonian expatriate footballers
1984 births
Living people
Veikkausliiga players
Rovaniemen Palloseura players
Expatriate footballers in Finland
Cameroonian expatriate sportspeople in Finland
Association football goalkeepers